Cerasella is a 1959 Italian teen comedy film directed by Raffaello Matarazzo. It is loosely inspired by the lyrics of the song "Cerasella".

Cast 
Claudia Mori: Cerasella
Mario Girotti: Bruno
Luigi De Filippo: Alfredo 
Alessandra Panaro: Nora 
Carlo Croccolo: Giuseppe Marzano 
Piera Farfarella: Nannina 
Fausto Cigliano: The Singer 
Mario Carotenuto: Father of Bruno
Lia Zoppelli: Mother of Nora
Luigi Pavese: General Bruno Coscia

References

External links

1959 films
1959 comedy films
Italian comedy films
Films directed by Raffaello Matarazzo
Films with screenplays by Ugo Pirro
Films set in Naples
1950s Italian films